Dailiang is the second solo album of Dantès Dailiang.  The Chinese name is 下有戴亮. .

The double Chinese-French album was released in 2009 and distributed in China by Jiesheng Records and with Mosaic Label in France.

Track listing
CD1

 下有戴亮
 现在 
 今晚我有一个梦  
 Oh ma chérie (你的爱到底给了谁)
 过程还是目标  
 属于幸福
 La muse aux lèvres rouges
 上海
 想起
 两千年我来到中国
  幸福满足感
 我记得你
 不知道
 合理自由
 两千年我来到中国 (不插电)

CD2
 Sur les ponts 
 L'autre rive 
   A trop vouloir
 Joie et satisfaction
 Ecrire
 Maintenant
 Et si j'oubliais 
 La muse aux lèvres rouges
 Dark Ubles
 Oh ma chérie
 Liberté saine
  Shanghai
   Je me souviens de toi
 Au nom de la vertu
 Et si j’oubliais (version acoustique)

References

2009 albums